The Canadian Olympic-training Regatta, Kingston (CORK) is an annual multi-class sailing regatta held off the shores of Kingston, Ontario, Canada.

External links
Canadian Olympic Regatta Kingston
Promotional video for CORK (Canadian Olympic Regatta at Kingston), ca. 1972, Archives of Ontario YouTube Channel 

Annual sporting events in Canada
Sport in Kingston, Ontario
Sailing competitions in Canada